The Moravian Church Mission Ships were a series of twelve ships (five named Harmony) that made an annual voyage from London to the Moravian Church mission stations in Labrador every summer for the 156 years between 1770 and 1926. The purpose of the voyages was to supply provisions to the church's mission stations in Labrador and to rotate mission personnel. All but one were pure sailing vessels; the final ship, Harmony #5, had an auxiliary steam engine.

Ownership
The ships were owned and operated by the Brethren's Society for the Furtherance of the Gospel among the Heathen, apparently a joint venture between the Moravian Church (the Unity of the Brethren) and the Society for the Furtherance of the Gospel among the Heathen.

Destinations
The mission stations during the time of the ships were Nain (established 1770), Okak (1776), Hopedale (1782), Hebron at Kauerdluksoak Bay (1830–1959) serving also Napartok Bay and Saeglek Bay, Zoar (1864–1889), Ramah (1871–1908), Makkovik (1896), and Killiniq on Cape Chidley island (1905–1925). Two further stations were added after this period at Happy Valley near Goose Bay (1957) and North West River (1960).

The ships

Spanish flu
In the summer of 1919, SS Harmony #5 carried Spanish flu from St John's to Hebron and Okak. The resulting deaths cut the population of Hebron and the surrounding area from 220 to 70. In Okak 204 of the 263 residents died, including every adult male Inuit; the survivors dismantled the community entirely, burning all houses and furniture before moving to Nain, Hopedale or Hebron.

References

External links
Photo: Moravian Mission supply ship SS Harmony (Harmony #5), Cartwright, Labrador, NL, 1926
Photo: Eskimos having a meal on SS Harmony

Moravian Church
Ships of England
1770 establishments in the British Empire
Christian missions in North America